The 2020 American Athletic Conference football season is the 29th NCAA Division I Football Bowl Subdivision season of the American Athletic Conference (The American). The season is the eighth since the former Big East Conference dissolved and became the American Athletic Conference and the seventh season of the College Football Playoff in place. The American is considered a member of the Group of Five (G5) together with Conference USA (C–USA), the Mid-American Conference (MAC), the Mountain West Conference and the Sun Belt Conference. The entire schedule was released on February 18, 2020.

Previous season
Memphis secured their third consecutive West division title and faced East champion Cincinnati in the 2019 AAC Championship game.

Seven teams participated in bowl games during the 2019 season; the league went 4–3.

SMU lost to Florida Atlantic 28–52 in the 2019 Boca Raton Bowl. UCF defeated Marshall in the Gasparilla Bowl 48–25. Temple lost to North Carolina 13–55 in the Military Bowl. No. 23 Navy defeated Kansas State 20–17 in the 2019 Liberty Bowl. No. 21 Cincinnati defeated Boston College 38–6 in the 2020 Birmingham Bowl after a ninety-minute rain delay. In the latest addition of the Battle for the Bell, Tulane defeated Southern Miss 30–13 in the Armed Forces Bowl.

In the New Year's Six Game, No. 17 Memphis lost to No. 10 Penn State 39–53 in the Cotton Bowl Classic.

Preseason

Departure of UConn
The Huskies' Big East entrance date was confirmed for July 1, 2020 after UConn and The American reached a buyout agreement. At the time this agreement was announced, UConn also announced that its football team would become an FBS independent once it joined the Big East. The American has no immediate plan to add another team to rebalance division, so divisions have been eliminated from the conference for the time being.

Recruiting classes

American Athletic Conference Media Days
The 2020 American Athletic Conference Media Day was originally scheduled for July 12–14 in Newport, Rhode Island.  On May 4, 2020 The American Announced due to the COVID-19 Pandemic media day was canceled.

Preseason media poll
The preseason Poll was released September 1

Head coaches

Coaching changes
At the end of his third season ended in a 4–8 record, South Florida fired Charlie Strong. On December 9, 2019, Jeff Scott, offensive coordinator for Clemson, was hired as the new head coach.

On December 8, 2019 after Norvell's departure to Florida State, Silverfield served as the interim head coach before being promoted to head coach on December 13, 2019.

Coaches
Note: All stats current through the completion of the 2020 season

Source:

Rankings

Schedule
The regular season will begin on September 5, 2020 and will end on November 28, 2020. The season will conclude with the 2020 American Athletic Conference Championship Game game on December 19.

Regular season

Week One

Week Two

Week Three

Week Four

Week Five

Week Six

Week Seven

Week Eight

Week Nine

Week Ten

Week Eleven

Week Twelve

Week Thirteen

Week Fourteen

Week Fifteen

Championship game

Postseason
For the 2020–2025 bowl cycle, The American will annually send teams to the Military Bowl, Fenway Bowl, and a third annual spot alternating between the Armed Forces Bowl and Hawaii Bowl annually.  The American will have annually four appearances in the following bowls: Birmingham Bowl, Gasparilla Bowl, Boca Raton Bowl, Frisco Bowl, Cure Bowl, First Responder Bowl, Myrtle Beach Bowl and  New Mexico Bowl.  The American champion will go to a New Year's Six bowl if a team finishes higher than the champions of Group of Five conferences in the final College Football Playoff rankings. American teams are also eligible for the College Football Playoff if they're among the top four teams in the final CFP ranking.

Bowl games

Cancelled bowls
The following annual bowl games tied in with the American Athletic Conference had their 2020 editions canceled :
Frisco Bowl scheduled for December 19 between SMU and UTSA was canceled due to COVID-19 complications within the SMU program. As a result, UTSA accepted a bid to the First Responder Bowl.
Military Bowl and Birmingham Bowl were canceled due to a lack of available teams to play.

Rankings are from CFP rankings.  All times Eastern Time Zone.  American teams shown in bold.

American vs other conferences

American vs Power 5 matchups
The following games include American teams competing against Power Five conferences teams from the (ACC, Big Ten, Big 12, Pac-12, Notre Dame, BYU and SEC). Due to the COVID-19 pandemic, most power five games for the American have been canceled, All of the Power Five conferences initially announced that they would go on with their season as scheduled, but with cuts to non-conference games in order to overcome logistical concerns and reduce travel. The Big Ten, Pac-12, and SEC were all limiting play to in-conference opponents only. The ACC and Big 12 are allowing one non-conference game each. The Big Ten and Pac 12 have postponed fall sports due to COVID-19 concerns.

American vs Group of Five matchups
The following games include American teams competing against teams from C-USA, MAC, Mountain West or Sun Belt. On August 8, the MAC announced the postponement of all fall sports for the 2020 season, including football. On August 10, the Mountain West followed the MAC as the second Group of Five conference to postpone fall sports indefinitely. On August 10, Rice announced it was the delaying the start of it season until September 26.

American vs FBS independents matchups
The following games include American teams competing against FBS Independents which include Army, Liberty, New Mexico State, UConn and UMass.  UConn, announced that they would opt out of the 2020 season. UMass announced that they would opt of playing fall football and hopes to construct a season in spring 2021. New Mexico State announced that they would opt out of playing fall football and try to play in spring 2021.

American vs FCS matchups
The Football Championship Subdivision comprises 13 conferences and two independent programs. All conferences and teams have postponed their fall conference schedules, The Big South, (James Madison, Elon, Villanova from the CAA), Missouri Valley Football Conference, Ohio Valley Conference, SoCon, and Southland Conference are allowing the option of playing out-of-conference games only

Records against other conferences

Regular Season

Post Season

Awards and honors

Player of the week honors

American Athletic Individual Awards
The following individuals received postseason honors as chosen by the league's head coaches.

All-Conference Teams

* Denotes Unanimous Selection

All Conference Honorable Mentions:
UCF: Lokahi Pauole (OG)
Cincinnati: Darrick Forrest (S), Darius Harper (OT)
ECU: Xavier Smith (LB)  
Houston: Braylon Jones (OG), Damarion Williams (CB)  
Memphis: Sean Dykes (TE), Morris Joseph (DL) 
SMU: Richard McBryde (LB)
Temple: Jadan Blue (WR)
Tulane: Joey Claybrook (OT)
Tulsa: Dante Bivens (OG), Dylan Couch (OG), Allie Green IV (CB), Kendarin Ray (S), Gerard Wheeler (C)

All-Americans

The 2020 College Football All-America Team is composed of the following College Football All-American first teams chosen by the following selector organizations: Associated Press (AP), Football Writers Association of America (FWAA), American Football Coaches Association (AFCA), Walter Camp Foundation (WCFF), The Sporting News (TSN), Sports Illustrated (SI), USA Today (USAT) ESPN, CBS Sports (CBS), FOX Sports (FOX) College Football News (CFN), Bleacher Report (BR), Scout.com, Phil Steele (PS), SB Nation (SB), Athlon Sports, Pro Football Focus (PFF), The Athletic, and Yahoo! Sports (Yahoo!).

Currently, the NCAA compiles consensus all-America teams in the sports of Division I-FBS football and Division I men's basketball using a point system computed from All-America teams named by coaches associations or media sources.  The system consists of three points for a first-team honor, two points for second-team honor, and one point for third-team honor.  Honorable mention and fourth team or lower recognitions are not accorded any points.  Football consensus teams are compiled by position and the player accumulating the most points at each position is named first team consensus all-American.  Currently, the NCAA recognizes All-Americans selected by the AP, AFCA, FWAA, TSN, and the WCFF to determine Consensus and Unanimous All-Americans. Any player named to the First Team by all five of the NCAA-recognized selectors is deemed a Unanimous All-American.

*CBS Sports All-America Team
*ESPN All-America Team
*The Athletic All-America Team
*USA Today All-America Team
*AP All-America Team
*The Sporting News All-America Team
*Football Writers' Association of America All-America Team
*American Football Coaches Association All-America Team
*2020 Walter Camp Football Foundation All-America Team
*Phil Steele All-America Team

National award winners

Lombardi Award (top player):
Zaven Collins, Tulsa

Campbell Trophy ("academic Heisman")
Brady White, Memphis

Bronko Nagurski Trophy (Best Defensive Player)
Zaven Collins, Tulsa

Chuck Bednarik Award (defensive player)
Zaven Collins, Tulsa

NFL Draft

The following list includes all AAC players who were drafted in the 2021 NFL Draft.

References